Emoluments Clause may refer to the following clauses in the United States Constitution:
 Ineligibility Clause, Article I, Section 6, Clause 2, also called the Incompatibility  Clause, affecting members of Congress
 Foreign Emoluments Clause, Article I, Section 9, Clause 8, also called the Title of Nobility Clause, affecting the executive branch
 Domestic Emoluments Clause, Article II, Section 1, Clause 7, also called the Presidential Emoluments Clause, affecting the President's salary